Karl Sverre Klevstad (born 29 June 1926, in Borge) is a Norwegian politician for the Christian Democratic Party.

He was elected to the Norwegian Parliament from Nordland in 1973, and was re-elected on one occasion. He served as a deputy representative during the term 1981–1985.

On the local level Klevstad was a member of Vestvågøy municipal council from 1971 to 1975, and later served as mayor from 1987 to 1991.

References

1926 births
Living people
Members of the Storting
Mayors of places in Nordland
Christian Democratic Party (Norway) politicians
20th-century Norwegian politicians